Skares is a village in East Ayrshire, Scotland.

It used to have a football team called Skares Bluebells.
Skares consisted of an older core of a village and three miners terraces. They were called, The Old Raw, The New Raw and the Tap Raw. These were built as mining expanded in the area, although today the mining has gone except for the opencast mine behind Skares.

From 1872 to 1951 it was served by Skares railway station.

External links 

Villages in East Ayrshire